SS R.J. Reynolds was a Liberty ship built in the United States during World War II. She was named after R. J. Reynolds, founder of the R. J. Reynolds Tobacco Company.

Construction
R.J. Reynolds was laid down on 19 August 1944, under a Maritime Commission (MARCOM) contract, MC hull 2377, by J.A. Jones Construction, Brunswick, Georgia; she was sponsored by Mrs. Richard J.E. Reynolds Jr., and launched on 30 September 1944.

History
She was allocated to Black Diamond Steamship Co., on 12 October 1944. On 11 January 1947, she laid up in the National Defense Reserve Fleet in Wilmington, North Carolina. On 13 December 1957, she was sold for $88,636, to Boston Metals Scrap Company, for scrapping. She was removed from the fleet on 8 February 1958.

References

Bibliography

 
 
 
 
 

 

Liberty ships
Ships built in Brunswick, Georgia
1944 ships
Wilmington Reserve Fleet